The Name Is Archer is a collection of short stories written by Ross Macdonald and featuring his detective hero, Lew Archer. Originally compiled in 1955 and published under the name John Ross Macdonald, more stories were added in later collections under different titles.

Publishing
The protagonists in Macdonald's first four novels had gone by a variety of names. It was not until his fifth novel, The Moving Target (1949), that the detective Lew Archer was introduced. Following that, Archer also began to feature in stories written for magazines, in which he uses the phrase "The name Is Archer" when identifying himself. Further stories were written over the next few years and all seven were published together under the title The name is Archer by Bantam Books in 1955, using the pseudonym John Ross Macdonald. Two additional stories published in magazines later were added to the collection Lew Archer:Private Investigator (Mysterious Press, 1977), this time using the name Ross Macdonald, although the title The Name Is Archer continued to be used for other paperback formats which contained a varying number of stories.

Contents
The stories that first appeared in The Name Is Archer were as follows:
 "Find the Woman" (originally titled "Death by Air" in Ellery Queen's Mystery Magazine, June 1946), by Kenneth Millar
 "The Bearded Lady", (American Magazine, October 1948), by Kenneth Millar
 "Gone Girl" (original title "Imaginary Blonde", Manhunt, February 1953), by Kenneth Millar
 "The Sinister Habit" (original title "The Guilty Ones", Manhunt, May 1953), by John Ross Macdonald
 "The Suicide" (original title "The Beat-Up Sister", Manhunt, October 1953), by John Ross Macdonald
 "Guilt-Edged Blonde" (Manhunt, January 1954), by John Ross Macdonald
 Wild Goose Chase (Ellery Queen's Mystery Magazine, July 1954), by John Ross Macdonald
The following two were added later:
 "Midnight Blue" (Ed McBain's Mystery Book, October 1960)
 Sleeping Dog (Argosy, April 1965)

The first of Macdonald's stories came to be written while he was still serving in the navy and decided to enter a short story competition sponsored by Ellery Queen's Mystery Magazine. "Death by Air" won the fourth prize and was published by the magazine. The name of the detective brought in there to locate a missing Hollywood starlet is Joe Rogers, although that was changed to Lew Archer in the Bantam anthology. However, when the story was later adapted for the CBS television series Pursuit in 1958, Macdonald insisted that its private eye should retain the name Joe Rogers and the episode was retitled "Epitaph for a Golden Girl". 

At the time he wrote the story, Macdonald was still under the influence of Raymond Chandler and made his detective, like Philip Marlowe, "a cultured man with a healthy sense of humor". Its first two pages come packed with typically light-hearted allusions. The narrator has recently been discharged from the navy: "I was all dressed up in civilian clothes with no place to go," he explains, adapting to his circumstances a song from 1913, "When You're All Dressed Up and No Place to Go". Then in walks his first client, the smartly turned-out Millicent Dreen. "My hair is hennaed but comely said her coiffure", adapting in this case the Biblical "I am black, but comely, O ye daughters of Jerusalem" from the Song of Songs - a statement "inviting not to conviction but to suspension of disbelief". The critical concept of suspending disbelief is discussed in Biographia Literaria (the work on which Macdonald was ultimately to write a thesis), but is borrowed from Aristotle's literary theory, and is the first of three successive references to Ancient Greek literature.

Millicent Dreen provides the next allusion when she remarks that "apron strings don't become me", adapting the title of the recent play-cycle Mourning Becomes Electra, which Eugene O’Neill had based on the Oresteia of Aeschylus. The narrator later caps this with a dramatic allusion of his own: "Una Sand meant less to me than Hecuba".  In this case he is referring to Hamlet's question, "What's Hecuba to him or he to Hecuba/ That he should weep for her?" Behind the history of Hecuba, however, lies her story as dramatised by Euripides in The Trojan Women. Cultural references were to continue throughout Macdonald's future work, though not quite in such concentrated form as here.

Cultural references, but now to works of art, continued into Macdonald's next published story. This was the novelette "The Bearded Lady", which features a stolen painting by Jean-Baptiste-Siméon Chardin, supposedly of a boy in a blue waistcoat looking at an apple. Within two pages mention of this is followed by a reference to a jungle "scene by Le Douanier Rousseau". And later on, Mr Hendryx’s bodyguard is described as "sitting in a Thinker pose", referring to the sculpture by Auguste Rodin. At first Macdonald had meant the story to be a money-spinning piece of formula writing and considered it "very bad". The detective was originally named Sam Drake and the action is set in San Marcos, a place "surrounded by the mountains that walled the city off from the desert in the north-east" that is based on Santa Barbara, the Californian town where Macdonald had moved. When he came to revise the story for the Bantam anthology, a fist fight with the bodyguard replaced its romantic sub-plot and Drake's name was changed to Archer.  

The title of another story, "Guilt-Edged Blonde", puns on the phrase gilt-edged bond. As the shortest in the collection, it has been frequently reprinted, both in Bloodhound Detective Story Magazine (May 1962) and Ellery Queen's Mystery Magazine (February 1974), as well as in a long line of anthologies, starting with the Mystery Writers of America collection, A Choice of Murders (1958). There have also been two film adaptations. Guilt-Edged Blonde, a black and white short from Cape Town International Film School, was winner of the 2002 Stone Award. The French full length feature, Le loup de la côte ouest (The Wolf of the West Coast, 2002), did less well.

Additional stories
After Macdonald's death, his biographer Tom Nolan discovered three more stories among his papers and published them as Strangers in Town (Crippen & Landru, 2001). One was "Death by Water", also featuring Joe Rogers, a companion piece to the original "Death by Air", that Macdonald never used because he considered its plot too similar to the other story. Another, "Strangers in Town", was written in 1950 and amplified into the novel The Ivory Grin two years later. Elements from the rejected story, including verbatim conversations, names of characters and the theme of an elderly gangster's gun moll, were later recycled in Macdonald's next piece of magazine fiction, "Gone Girl", which was published after the appearance of The Ivory Grin. This time featuring Lew Archer in his own right, the story appeared in the New York magazine Manhunt, a venture aiming "to combine the hard-boiled style of classic pulps with the commercial appeal of Spillane", for which Macdonald wrote a further three short stories also.  

The third unpublished story that appeared in the Strangers in Town volume was "The Angry Man", written in 1955. Macdonald chose instead to use it as the basis for the later novel The Doomsters (1958). In his notebooks there remained a number of shorter pieces, possible opening scenes for other short stories or novels, written over the period 1952-65. These were discovered after Macdonald's death by Tom Nolan, who combined them with all of Macdonald's short fiction in a final section titled "Case Notes" when he edited them as The Archer Files in 2007.

Bibliography
 Tom Nolan, Ross Macdonald: a biography, Scribner 1999

References

Lew Archer (series)
Detective fiction short stories